The Armenia Fed Cup team represents Armenia in Fed Cup tennis competitions and are governed by the Armenian Tennis Federation. They currently compete in the Europe/Africa Zone of Group III.

History
Armenia competed in its first Fed Cup in 1997. Their best result was finishing third in their Group II pool in 2000 and 2001. Prior to 1991, Armenian players were represented by the Soviet Union.

Team (2017)
Anna Movsisyan
Gabriella Akopyan
Marina Davtyan

See also

Fed Cup
Armenia Davis Cup team

External links

Billie Jean King Cup teams
Fed Cup
Fed Cup